Captain Sir Henry Moore Jackson  (bapt. 13 August 1849 – 29 August 1908) was a British Army officer and colonial governor.

Biography
Jackson was born in Barbados to Walrond Jackson, who became the Anglican Bishop of Antigua, and Mary Shepherd. He received his education in England at Clifton College and the Royal Military Academy. After his education, Jackson went into the military, serving for the Royal Artillery from 1870 to 1885, reaching the rank of captain. In 1880 while still in the Royal Artillery he was also appointed commandant of the Sierra Leone police.

It was after his military service that he became involved in the rule of British colonies. Starting with his appointment as commissioner for Turks and Caicos Islands from 1885 to 1890 and later Colonial Secretary of the Bahama Islands from 1890 to 1893. His next appointment came in 1894 when he was appointed as Colonial Secretary of Gibraltar from 1894 to 1901. Here his education in science proved useful in implementing a plan to construct a new harbour. In August 1901 he was appointed Governor of the Leeward Islands, but his tenure there was short as in June the following year he was appointed Governor of Fiji and High Commissioner of the Western Pacific, combined with the position of Consul-General for the Western Pacific Islands. He arrived in Fiji to take up the position in September 1902, and is credited as having promoted the idea of British rule to the natives of Fiji. Australian Methodists protested against his appointment as he was a Catholic, provoking counter-protests in Fiji. The last position he held was Governor of Trinidad and Tobago, which he held until his death on 29 August 1908.

Jackson received several honours, including: Knight Commander of the Order of St Michael and St George in 1899, promoted to Knight Grand Cross in 1908, and member of the Order of St. Gregory the Great in 1904.

Family

In 1881, Jackson married Emily Shea, daughter of Sir Edward Dalton Shea. He was the father of Basil Jackson, chairman of BP. In 1880, Jackson converted to Catholicism.

References

|-

1849 births
1908 deaths
People educated at Clifton College
Governors of Fiji
Royal Artillery officers
Governors of Trinidad and Tobago
Knights Grand Cross of the Order of St Michael and St George
Commissioners of the Turks and Caicos Islands
British colonial police officers
Grenadian people of British descent
Grenadian emigrants to England
High Commissioners for the Western Pacific
Colonial Secretaries of the Bahamas
Colonial Secretaries of Gibraltar